Belitsa Peninsula is the 13-km wide peninsula projecting 8.5 km in northwest direction from Trinity Peninsula, Antarctic Peninsula.  Bounded by Bone Bay to the northeast, Charcot Bay to the southwest and Bransfield Strait to the northwest.  Trapezoid in form, its west and north extremities are formed by Cape Kjellman and Notter Point respectively. Beaver Rocks  are a group of rocks lying 2 nautical miles (4 km) off Belitsa Peninsula at a point midway between Notter Point and Cape Kjellman.

The peninsula is named after the town of Belitsa in southwestern Bulgaria.

Location
German-British mapping in 1996.

Maps
 Trinity Peninsula. Scale 1:250000 topographic map No. 5697. Institut für Angewandte Geodäsie and British Antarctic Survey, 1996.
 Antarctic Digital Database (ADD). Scale 1:250000 topographic map of Antarctica. Scientific Committee on Antarctic Research (SCAR), 1993–2016.

References
 Bulgarian Antarctic Gazetteer. Antarctic Place-names Commission. (details in Bulgarian, basic data in English)
 Belitsa Peninsula. SCAR Composite Antarctic Gazetteer

External links
 Belitsa Peninsula. Copernix satellite image

Peninsulas of Graham Land
Landforms of Trinity Peninsula
Bulgaria and the Antarctic